John Andru (20 November 1932 – 15 March 2003) was a Canadian fencer. He competed at the 1964 and 1968 Summer Olympics. He was inducted into the Canadian Olympic Hall of Fame.

References

1932 births
2003 deaths
Canadian male fencers
Olympic fencers of Canada
Fencers at the 1964 Summer Olympics
Fencers at the 1968 Summer Olympics
Fencers at the 1966 British Empire and Commonwealth Games
Fencers at the 1962 British Empire and Commonwealth Games
Sportspeople from Toronto
Commonwealth Games medallists in fencing
Commonwealth Games silver medallists for Canada
Commonwealth Games bronze medallists for Canada
Pan American Games medalists in fencing
Pan American Games bronze medalists for Canada
Fencers at the 1959 Pan American Games
Fencers at the 1967 Pan American Games
20th-century Canadian people
21st-century Canadian people
Medallists at the 1958 British Empire and Commonwealth Games
Medallists at the 1962 British Empire and Commonwealth Games
Medallists at the 1966 British Empire and Commonwealth Games